Prevalence of tobacco use is reported by the World Health Organization (WHO), which focuses on cigarette smoking due to reported data limitations. Smoking has therefore been studied more extensively than any other form of consumption.

Smoking is generally five times more prevalent among men than women; however, the gender gap differs across countries and is smaller in younger age groups. In developed countries smoking rates for men have peaked and have begun to decline, and also started to stall or decline for women. Smoking prevalence has changed little since the mid-1990s, before which time it declined in English-speaking countries due to the implementation of tobacco control. However, the number of smokers worldwide has increased from 721 million in 1980 to 967 million in 2012 and the number of cigarettes smoked increased from 4.96 trillion to 6.25 trillion due to population growth.

In Western countries, smoking is more prevalent among populations with mental health problems, with alcohol and drug problems, among criminals, and among the homeless. In 2002, about 20% of young teens (aged 13–15) smoked worldwide. 80,000 to 100,000 children begin smoking every day. Half of those who begin smoking in adolescent years are projected to go on to smoke for 15 to 20 years.

One of the targets of the Sustainable Development Goal 3 of the United Nations (to be achieved by 2030) is to "Strengthen the implementation of the World Health Organization Framework Convention on Tobacco Control in all countries, as appropriate." The indicator that is used to measure progress is the prevalence of tobacco use.

Background 
WHO states that "Much of the disease burden and premature mortality attributable to tobacco use disproportionately affect the poor". Of the 1.22 billion smokers, 1 billion of them live in developing or transitional economies. Rates of smoking have leveled off or declined in the developed world. In the developing world, tobacco consumption is rising by 3.4% per year as of 2002.

The WHO in 2004 projected 58.8 million deaths to occur globally, from which 5.4 million are tobacco-attributed, and 4.9 million as of 2007. As of 2002, 70% of the deaths are in developing countries.

One of the targets of the Sustainable Development Goal 3 of the United Nations (to be achieved by 2030) is to "Strengthen the implementation of the World Health Organization Framework Convention on Tobacco Control in all countries, as appropriate." The indicator that is used to measure progress is the "age-standardized prevalence of current tobacco use among persons aged 15 years and older".

Worldwide 
Prevalence of tobacco use (% of adults) worldwide

Countries 
The following is a list of countries by the percentage of age-standardized prevalence of tobacco smoking among persons 15 years and older as published by the World Health Organization.

Australia 
In the 20th century, smoking was common. There were social events like the smoke night which promoted the habit. In Australia the incidence of smoking is in decline, with figures from the 2011-12 Australian Health Survey showing 18% of the population to be current smokers, a decline from 28% in 1989–90.

Among the indigenous population, the rate was much higher: 50% of men and 44% of women reported being current smokers in 2007–08.

People aged 25 to 34 were the most likely to smoke (24%), with a marked decline in smoking rates as age increased past 45 years in 2011–12.

In 2007–08, the prevalence of smoking was strongly associated with socioeconomic disadvantage: a greater proportion of men (33%) and women (26%) who live in the most disadvantaged 20% of areas were current smokers than those who live in the least disadvantaged 20% of areas (12% and 11% respectively).

In 2016 the daily smoking rate was less than 13%.

Canada 
In December 2002, Statistics Canada published a report on smoking prevalence from 1985 to 2001. In that report they found from 1985 to 1991, prevalence of "current smoking" (which they defined as daily smokers and occasional smokers) declined overall, for both sexes and all age groups except for those aged 15 to 24. Even larger declines occurred from 1991 to 2001. While current smoking prevalence for youths did not significantly change from 1985 to 1994–1995, there was a significant decrease of 6 percentage points from 1994–1995 to 2001 (from 28.5% to 22.5%). Provincially, Newfoundland and Labrador, Nova Scotia, Quebec, Ontario, Saskatchewan, Alberta and British Columbia, experienced most of their declines in current smoking prevalence from 1994 to 1995 onwards. All of the provinces experienced some level of declines over the entire 1985 to 2001 period. Declines in daily smoking prevalence occurred for both sexes and all age groups over the entire 17-year time span, although youth smoking did not start significantly declining until the mid-1990s. Overall, for daily cigarette consumption, smokers by 2001 had a significantly lower proportion of smoking 26 or more cigarettes daily compared with 1985 (14.0% to 5.8%). Most of the declines in the different sex or age groups occurred after 1991. At the same time however, smokers in 2001 had a significantly higher proportion of smoking 1 to 10 cigarettes daily compared with 1985 (18.6% to 31.1%). Most of the decline occurred after 1991. As of 2008 the rate was estimated to be 18%, and declining. A 2011 survey estimates that 17% of Canadians smoke.

Germany 
In 2005, 27% of the population admitted to being current smokers. 23% were regular smokers (28% of men and 19% of women,) while 4% smoked irregularly. The highest ratio of regular smokers was in the 20-24 age group: 38% of men and 30% of women. According to a 2010 study by University of Bielefeld, 9.9% of all 15-year-old males and 10.8% of 15-year-old females smoked daily, which showed a strong decline during the previous decade.

Like in the most industrial countries the smoking rate in Germany decreases with increasing education level.

A 2006 comparative study found that 25.1% of male and 20.6% of female medical students in Göttingen smoke, while in London the ratios were only 10.9% and 9.1%.

Germany has the largest number of cigarette vending machines per capita in the world: 1 per 102.5 people.

Israel 
In Israel, smoking prevalence among males had remained relatively constant at 30%  in the years 1994–2004. Among females the prevalence has declined slightly from 25% in 1998 to 18% in 2003. For the youth, 14% smoked at least once per week, according to a 2001 publication.

In 2005, research has shown that Israeli youths have begun to use bidis and hookah, as alternative methods of tobacco use. In 1990, smoking was the cause of about 1,800 male deaths in Israel which was around 12% of all male deaths. Smoking has not been found to be significant cause of death among Israeli women. The average number of cigarettes smoked per Israeli stands at 2162 (6).

There are several anti-tobacco use legislations in effect. For instance, advertising is prohibited in youth publications and is forbidden on television and radio, in addition to substantial increases in tobacco taxes, although the prices are still among the lowest compared to all of the European countries. In addition, until 2004, there was no minimum age requirement for buying tobacco products in Israel; however, an amendment to the tobacco marketing and advertisement law that became effective at 2004 has limited the sale of tobacco to people above the age of 18.

According to Israel Central Bureau of Statistics, the smoking rate in the Israeli adult population in 2009 was 20.9%, down from 34% in 2000. A Ministry of Health nationwide survey conducted in 2011 found that 20.6% of the population aged 21 and older were smokers. The highest percentage of smokers was among Arab males, 44% percent of whom smoked, though this figure is down from 50% in 1996.

New Zealand 
Tobacco consumption in New Zealand peaked in the mid-1970s when 60% of the population were smokers. By 2011 that number had fallen to 20% of the population, thanks to stringent tobacco control laws which are amongst the world's strictest. However, despite these laws, the number of smokers appears to be increasing as the global economy worsens and a recent spate of natural disasters have seen an increase in tobacco sales and although more males smoke than females, this gap is slowly narrowing. Tobacco consumption by Maori remains disproportionately high despite having decreased over recent years thanks to television, internet, radio and print media anti-smoking advertising aimed at Maori. The high rate of Maori tobacco consumption has been described by many Maori health advocates and academics as a "cultural genocide".

Romania 
According to the Romanian Ministry of Health, the smoking rate among the general population declined from 36% in 2004 to 26% in 2011. A report commissioned in 2012 revealed that 34.9% of men smoked daily, compared to 14.5% of women, and in the preceding 12 months, 37.8% of regular smokers had attempted to quit at least once. Despite a general decline in smoking prevalence, the rate among women nearly doubled from 1991 to 2011, with 55% of women smokers belonging to the 15–34 age group.

Spain 
According to the 2017 National Health Survey  22.1% of the population above the age of 15 reports smoking daily, 2.3% declares smoking occasionally, 24.9% reports being ex-smokers and 50,7% never smoked. The survey also revealed that 25,6% of men smoked, compared to 18.8% women. The historical data series shows the rate in Spain has fallen more than 10 points from 1993 to 2017, from 44% to 25.6% for men and from 20.8% to 18.8% for women. However, since 2014, the trend has slowed, with just less than 1 point improvement, from 23% to 22,1%.

Sweden 

The first research of smoking habits in Sweden was performed in 1946; it showed that 50% of men, and 9% of women were smokers. In 1977 41% of men and  32% of women were smokers. By 2011, the use of smoking tobacco on a daily basis had decreased to only 12.5% and 14.3% among women. The use of snus, on a daily basis among men older than 15 years, was approximately 19.4% and only 3.0% for women.

United Kingdom 

The Health Survey for England in 2002 found a smoking rate of 26%. By 2007 the proportion of adult smokers in England had declined four percentage points to 22%. In 2015, it was reported smoking rates in England had fallen to 16.9%, a record low. The rate in England had fallen to 14.4% in 2018.

Overall, the numbers of smokers in the UK in 2007 was estimated at 13.7 million.  In 2007 the rate of smoking amongst the most socioeconomically affluent patients was 14%, compared to 34% for the most deprived. Figures from 2013 show that proportion of the British population (UK excluding Northern Ireland) who smoke has fallen to 19%.

United States 
Of U.S. smokers in 2005, 80.8% (or 36.5 million) smoked every day, and 19.2% (or 8.7 million) smoked some days. The prevalence of current cigarette smoking also varied substantially across population groups. For instance, current smoking was higher among men at 23.9% than women at 18.1%. This is consistent with other countries (see table). Among racial and ethnic groups, Native Americans and Alaska Natives had the highest prevalence at 32.0%, followed by non-Hispanic whites at 21.9%, and non-Hispanic blacks at 21.5%. Hispanics at 16.2%, and Asians at 13.3% had the lowest rates.

Smoking prevalence also based on education level, with the highest among adults who had earned a General Educational Development (GED) diploma at 43.2% and those with 9–11 years of education at 32.6%. Prevalence generally decreased with increasing education. Adults aged 18–24 years were at 24.4% and 25–44 years were at 24.1% had the highest prevalences. The prevalence of current smoking was higher among adults living below the poverty line at 29.9% than among those at or above the poverty line at 20.6%.

In 2005, the CDC set a 2010 target of 12% for current cigarette smoking prevalence. Certain populations had already surpassed these when it was set. This included Hispanic (11.1%) and Asian (6.1%) women, women with undergraduate (9.6%) or graduate (7.4%) degrees, men with undergraduate (11.9%) or graduate (6.9%) degrees, men aged over 65 years (8.9%), and women aged over 65 years (8.3%).

In 2013, the national smoking average in the United States was 19.6% of the adult population. The following have some of the lowest percentages of smokers with their states: 
 Utah, 10.6%, lowest percentage of smokers.
 California, 11.7% 2nd lowest. 
 Hawaii, 14.6%, 3rd lowest. 
 Connecticut, 16%, 4th lowest.
 Massachusetts, 16.4%, 7th lowest.
 Vermont, 16.5%, 9th lowest.

Among cigarette smokers in 2005, an estimated 42.5% had stopped smoking for at least 1 day during the preceding 12 months because they were trying to quit. Among the estimated 42.5% (or 91.8 million) of people who had smoked at least 100 cigarettes during their lifetimes (the question the CDC asked to measure if they were ever smokers or not), 50.8% (or 46.5 million) did not smoke currently. In 2005, prevalence of current cigar smoking was 2.2% and current smokeless tobacco use was 2.3%. Prevalence of cigar smoking and use of smokeless tobacco were higher among men (4.3% and 4.5%, respectively) than women (0.3% and 0.2%).

There are large regional differences in smoking rates, with Kentucky, West Virginia, Oklahoma and Mississippi topping the list, and Idaho, California and Utah at significantly lower rates.

Persons with mental illness, making up about 20% of the population, consume about 33% of the tobacco used. Persons with serious mental illness die 25 years earlier than average, often from smoking related illnesses.

In November 2015, the Centers for Disease Control (CDC) and Prevention noted in their report, "The percentage of U.S. adults who smoke cigarettes declined from 20.9 percent in 2005 to 16.8 percent in 2014. Cigarette smoking was significantly lower in 2014 (16.8 percent) than in 2013 (17.8 percent)." The CDC concluded this from data obtained by a survey of Americans. However, researchers said that they are not sure if products 
like e-cigarettes are in any way helpful to reduce smokers in the country. Around 4,000 minors start smoking in the US every day.

As of 2018, a total of 13.7% of U.S. adults (16.7% of men and 13.6% of women) smoke.

See also
List of countries by cigarette consumption per capita

References

External links

WHO Report on the Global Tobacco Epidemic, 2009: Surveys of adult tobacco use in WHO Member States
 
 
Smoking Proves Hard to Shake Among the Poor

Smoking
Tobacco